Issus is a genus of planthoppers belonging to the family Issidae of infraorder Fulgoromorpha of suborder Auchenorrhyncha of order Hemiptera. Like most members of the order Hemiptera (popularly known as the "bug" or "true bugs" order) they live on phloem sap that they extract with their piercing, sucking mouth parts.

Planthoppers are the only animals known to possess a gear mechanism, and Issus coleoptratus is the first type of planthopper to have the mechanism formally described. The mesh sector gears do not transform velocity or torque, and they do not convey much of the power; they only synchronize the jumping motion of the hind legs, preventing yaw (rotation).

Description
The genus Issus includes small insects generally flightless with a stocky, brown body and forewings with strong pronounced ribs. They feed on phloem. Species of this genus are present in most of Europe, in the Near East, and in North Africa.

Gear mechanism
Planthoppers (of which there are over 12,000 known species) are the first animals found to possess a biological form of a mechanical gear, used in locomotion (crocodiles possess a heart valve with cog-like projections, but they have no cog-like function.) The first formal description of this mechanism was in the species Issus coleoptratus. The gears keep the hind legs in synchronization, allowing the bugs to jump accurately in a straight line, at an acceleration of nearly 400 g in two milliseconds. Each leg has a 400-micrometer strip of tapered teeth, pitch radius 200 micrometers, with 10 to 12 fully interlocking spur-type gear teeth, including filleted curves at the base of each tooth, which reduces wear and the risk of shearing. The gears aren't connected all the time. One is located on each of the juvenile insect's hind legs, and when it prepares to jump, the two sets of teeth lock together. As a result, the legs move in almost perfect unison for a straight jump, giving the insect more connected power as the gears rotate together to their stopping point and then unlock. 

The existence of the gears in planthoppers had been known for decades, but zoologist Gregory Sutton and his co-authors only recently characterized their functional significance by doing high-speed photography of Issus coleoptratus at Cambridge University. The gears are found only in the nymph forms of all planthoppers, and are lost during the final molt to the adult stage. The juveniles repeatedly molt and grow new gears before adulthood. It is suspected that the gears are lost after the last molt into an adult because if broken in an adult they would be irreparable, crippling the insect for life. The legs of an adult planthopper are synchronized by a different mechanism, a series of protrusions that extend from both hind legs, and push the other leg into action.  

Before the planthopper nymph's hind leg mesh gears were discovered, it was assumed that only humans made and used gears.

List of species
This genus include the following 29 species:

Issus analis Brullé, 1832
Issus bellardi Melichar, 1906
Issus bimaculatus Melichar, 1906
Issus cagola Remane, 1985
Issus cagracala Remane, 1985
Issus cahipi Remane, 1985
Issus canalaurisi Sergel, 1986
Issus canariensis Melichar, 1906
Issus capala Remane 1985
Issus capapi Remane1985
Issus cinereus (Olivier, 1791)
Issus climacus Fieber, 1876
Issus coleoptratus (Fabricius, 1781)
Issus distinguendus Lindberg, 1954
Issus fieberi Melichar 1906
Issus fissala Fieber 1876
Issus gracalama Remane, 1985
Issus gratehigo Remane, 1985
Issus hipidus Remane, 1985
Issus lauri Ahrens, 1818
Issus maderensis Lindberg, 1956
Issus muscaeformis (Schrank, 1781)
Issus padipus Remane, 1985
Issus paladitus Remane, 1985
Issus palama Remane, 1985
Issus pallipes Lucas, 1853
Issus pospisili Dlabola, 1958
Issus rarus Lindberg, 1954
Issus truncatus Fieber, 1876

See also
Biological screw joint, found in the hip joints of some weevils

References

External links

Fauna Europaea
Biolib

Issinae
Auchenorrhyncha genera
Hemiptera of Europe